Avinash Chandra Vidyarthi was a Bhojpuri author and poet. He was from Shahpur, near Arrah in Bhojpur District of Bihar. He has contributed significantly to Bhojpuri Literature. He was also one of the editors of Bhikhari Thakur Rachnavali, a compilations of Bhikhari Thakur works.

Works 

 Jay Bangla
 Beta Ke Naihar (Essay)

Short story collection 

 Daga Baji Gail

Poetry collection 

 Anasail Raag
Leela ee Shree Ram-Shyam ke

Essay collection 

 Ghar ke gur

Reference 

Poets from Bihar
People from Bhojpur district, India
Bhojpuri-language writers